Caroline Putnam may refer to:

 Caroline Remond Putnam (1826–1908), African-American abolitionist
 Caroline F. Putnam (1826–1917), abolitionist and educator from Massachusetts